Usherin is a protein that in humans is encoded by the USH2A gene.

This gene encodes the protein Usherin that contains laminin EGF motifs, a pentraxin domain, and many fibronectin type III motifs. The encoded basement membrane-associated protein may be important in development and homeostasis of the inner ear and retina. Mutations within this gene have been associated with Usher syndrome type IIa. Alternatively spliced transcript variants that encode different isoforms have been described.

References

Further reading

External links
  GeneReviews/NCBI/NIH/UW entry on Usher Syndrome Type II